Mühlbach is a small river of Baden-Württemberg, Germany. It is a right tributary of the Schussen near Meckenbeuren.

See also
List of rivers of Baden-Württemberg

Rivers of Baden-Württemberg
Rivers of Germany